Lupercalia was a pastoral festival of Ancient Rome observed annually on February 15 to purify the city, promoting health and fertility.  Lupercalia was also known as dies Februatus, after the purification instruments called februa, the basis for the month named Februarius.

Name
Ovid connects  to an Etruscan word for "purging".

The name Lupercalia was believed in antiquity to evince some connection with the Ancient Greek festival of the Arcadian Lykaia, a wolf festival (lýkos), and the worship of Lycaean Pan, assumed to be a Greek equivalent to Faunus, as instituted by Evander. Justin describes a cult image of "the Lycaean god, whom the Greeks call Pan and the Romans Lupercus", as nude, save for a goatskin girdle. 

The statue stood in the Lupercal, the cave where tradition held that Romulus and Remus were suckled by the she-wolf (Lupa). The cave lay at the foot of the Palatine Hill, on which Romulus was thought to have founded Rome. The name of the festival most likely derives from lupus, "wolf", though both the etymology and its significance are obscure. The wolf appellation may have to do with the fact that an animal predator plays a key role in male rites of passage. Despite Justin's assertion, no deity named "Lupercus" has been identified.

Rites

Locations
The rites were confined to the Lupercal cave, the Palatine Hill, and the Forum, all of which were central locations in Rome's foundation myth. Near the cave stood a sanctuary of Rumina, goddess of breastfeeding; and the wild fig-tree (Ficus Ruminalis) to which Romulus and Remus were brought by the divine intervention of the river-god Tiberinus; some Roman sources name the wild fig tree caprificus, literally "goat fig". Like the cultivated fig, its fruit is pendulous, and the tree exudes a milky sap if cut, which makes it a good candidate for a cult of breastfeeding.

Priesthoods

The Lupercalia had its own priesthood, the Luperci ("brothers of the wolf"), whose institution and rites were attributed either to the Arcadian culture-hero Evander, or to Romulus and Remus, erstwhile shepherds who had each established a group of followers. The Luperci were young men (iuvenes), usually between the ages of 20 and 40. They formed two religious collegia (associations) based on ancestry; the Quinctiliani (named after the gens Quinctia) and the Fabiani (named after the gens Fabia). Each college was headed by a magister.

In 44 BC, a third college, the Juliani, was instituted in honor of Julius Caesar; its first magister was Mark Antony. The college of Juliani disbanded or lapsed following the Assassination of Julius Caesar, and was not re-established in the reforms of his successor, Augustus. In the Imperial era, membership of the two traditional collegia was opened to iuvenes of equestrian status.

Sacrifice
At the Lupercal altar, a male goat (or goats) and a dog were sacrificed by one or another of the Luperci, under the supervision of the Flamen dialis, Jupiter's chief priest. An offering was also made of salted mealcakes, prepared by the Vestal Virgins. After the blood sacrifice, two Luperci approached the altar. Their foreheads were anointed with blood from the sacrificial knife, then wiped clean with wool soaked in milk, after which they were expected to laugh.

The sacrificial feast followed, after which the Luperci cut thongs (known as ) from the flayed skin of the animal, and ran with these, naked or near-naked, along the old Palatine boundary, in an anticlockwise direction around the hill. In Plutarch's description of the Lupercalia, written during the early Empire,
...many of the noble youths and of the magistrates run up and down through the city naked, for sport and laughter striking those they meet with shaggy thongs. And many women of rank also purposely get in their way, and like children at school present their hands to be struck, believing that the pregnant will thus be helped in delivery, and the barren to pregnancy.
The Luperci completed their circuit of the Palatine, then returned to the Lupercal cave.

History

The Februa was of ancient and possibly Sabine origin. After February was added to the Roman calendar, Februa occurred on its fifteenth day. Of its various rituals, the most important came to be those of the Lupercalia. The Romans themselves attributed the instigation of the Lupercalia to Evander, a culture hero from Arcadia who was credited with bringing the Olympic pantheon, Greek laws and alphabet to Italy, where he founded the city of Pallantium on the future site of Rome, 60 years before the Trojan War.

Lupercalia was celebrated in parts of Italy; Luperci are attested by inscriptions at Velitrae, Praeneste, Nemausus (modern Nîmes) and elsewhere.

Descriptions of the Lupercalia festival of 44 BC attest to its continuity; Julius Caesar used it as the backdrop for his public refusal of a golden crown offered to him by Mark Antony. The Lupercalia festival is marked on a calendar of 354 alongside traditional and Christian festivals. 

Despite the banning in 391 of all non-Christian cults and festivals, the Lupercalia was celebrated by the nominally Christian populace on a regular basis into the reign of the emperor Anastasius. Pope Gelasius I (494–96) claimed that only the "vile rabble" were involved in the festival and sought its forceful abolition; the Roman Senate protested that the Lupercalia was essential to Rome's safety and well-being. This prompted Gelasius' scornful suggestion that "If you assert that this rite has salutary force, celebrate it yourselves in the ancestral fashion; run nude yourselves that you may properly carry out the mockery".

There is no contemporary evidence to support the popular notions that Gelasius abolished the Lupercalia, or that he, or any other prelate, replaced it with the Feast of the Purification of the Blessed Virgin Mary. A literary association between the Lupercalia and the romantic elements of Saint Valentine's Day dates back to Chaucer and poetic traditions of courtly love.

Legacy

Horace's Ode III, 18 alludes to the Lupercalia. The festival or its associated rituals gave its name to the Roman month of February and thence to the modern month. The Roman god Februus personified both the month and purification, but seems to postdate both.

William Shakespeare's play Julius Caesar begins during the Lupercalia. Mark Antony is instructed by Caesar to strike his wife Calpurnia, in the hope that she will be able to conceive.

Research published in 2019 suggests that the word Leprechaun derives from Lupercus.

References

Citations

Bibliography
A. M. Franklin, The Lupercalia (doctoral dissertation, 1921, 102pp.)
 
 Liebler, Naomi Conn (1988). The Ritual Ground of Julius Caesar.

Further reading
Beard, Mary; North, John; Price, Simon. Religions of Rome: A History. Cambridge University Press, 1998, vol. 1, limited preview online; search "Lupercalia".
Lincoln, Bruce. Authority: Construction and Corrosion. University of Chicago Press, 1994, pp. 43–44 online on Julius Caesar and the politicizing of the Lupercalia; valuable list of sources pp. 182–183.
North, John. Roman Religion. The Classical Association, 2000, pp. 47 online and 50 on the problems of interpreting evidence for the Lupercalia.
Markus, R.A. The End of Ancient Christianity. Cambridge University Press, 1990, pp. 131–134 online, on the continued celebration of the Lupercalia among "uninhibited Christians" into the 5th century, and the reasons for the "brutal intervention" by Pope Gelasius.
 
 
 
Vuković, Krešimir. Wolves of Rome: The Lupercalia from Roman and Comparative Perspectives. Walter de Gruyter, 2023, limited preview online
Wiseman, T.P.  "The Lupercalia". In Remus: A Roman Myth. Cambridge, Cambridge University Press, 1995, pp. 77–88, limited preview online, discussion of the Lupercalia in the context of myth and ritual.
 Wiseman, T.P. "The God of the Lupercal", in Idem, Unwritten Rome. Exeter, University of Exeter Press, 2008.

External links
William Smith, Dictionary of Greek and Roman Antiquities, 1875: Lupercalia

 
Ancient Roman festivals
February observances
Wolves in folklore, religion and mythology
She-wolf (Roman mythology)